Tabcorp Park, Menangle, is a harness racing track operating in Menangle Park, New South Wales, Australia. The New South Wales Harness Racing Club conducts meetings at the Paceway. The New South Wales Harness Racing Club trading as Club Menangle Trackside is located within the Paceway grounds. Major extensions to the club at the licensed historic premises previously known as the Horse and Jockey Inn just outside the paceway grounds, opened in September 2019.

History
The Menangle Park Paceway was opened in 1914 and after the outbreak of World War I, it was requisitioned as an army camp used for the Australian Light Horse. The facility was returned to the owners for horse racing, until 18 November 1941, when the racecourse was again taken over by the military during World War II.

The racecourse was converted into a military camp, providing camping and training facilities for Royal Australian Air Force constructed an aerodrome at the site in 1942, which went through the middle of the racecourse, which was known as Menangle Aerodrome. Seven splinterproof pens and five concealed hideouts were constructed at the aerodrome. The site was also used as an aircraft park for HMS Nabthorpe, a Royal Navy Mobile Operational Naval Air Base, based at Schofields.

_

2021   Menangle Park stages over 100 race meetings per year (twice a week). It is a much sought after venue in the Macarthur region for functions/trade shows and festivals. Club Menangle embraces the local community through many functions and charity drives. Club Menangle is the home of the $1million Garrard's Miracle Mile, the richest harness racing race in the Southern Hemisphere

2011   Following the closure of Harold Park on 17 December 2010, the NSW Harness Racing Club (now branded as Club Menangle) moved all its operations to the Menangle Park track. It is now the show piece for harness racing in New South Wales.

2008   After a major facelift, the Menangle Park 1400-metre track was officially opened on 24 June before a strong 8,000 crowd.

2000   Works commenced to rebuild and change the Menangle Park track from the 800-metre circuit to a new state-of-the-art 1400-metre complex.

1980s  Again in this decade well patronised harness racing meetings were held at the picturesque out of town track.  Menangle Park track was also the venue for the very successful Sunday Menangle Markets that were conducted each week for a number of years.

1970s  Strong and well patronised harness racing meeting were held at Menangle Park. In 1975 the local Campbelltown Show, that had previous been held for a number of years at the Showground in the centre of town, was moved and was held successful for a number of years at the Menangle Park venue.

1964   Night trotting was introduced to the Menangle Park track on 2 November.

1953   After extensive work and remodelling, the NSW Trotting Club opened racing on 26 September, at it new 'Out of Town' track. A huge crowd of 5,000 attended the opening, and the new trotting track was officially opened by Governor, Sir William McKell.

1952   After being dormant for a few years following its use in WWII, the racecourse site was put up for auction for 25,000 pounds by the owner the Menangle Park Racing Company Limited. There were no bidders. Bill Dunlop, the then President of the NSW Trotting Club, then arranged a private purchase.

1943   The racecourse was again commissioned by the Air Force RAAF and Army, this time during World War II. An airstrip was built in the middle of the track. This airstrip was used by Sir Charles Kingsford-Smith in the film ‘Smithy’ that was produced in the late 1940s.

1920   Racing resumed at the racecourse and both thoroughbred and trotting meetings were conducted. Notable thoroughbred, ‘Rogilla’, a Caulfield Cup winner and multiple feature race winner, won his Maiden (first win) race at Menangle Park in 1931.  

1917   The racecourse site was commissioned by the Army for World War I. It was the training camp for the Lighthorse and the Camel Corp.

1914   On 6 August, the first Official Race meeting (gallops) was held at the Racecourse. A sprinkling of harness racing meetings were held by the 'Menangle Park Trotting Club'

1913   In September, the final plans for the building of the 'Menangle Park Racecourse', were finalised by the Architect, local A.R. (Alf) Payten

1820   Menangle House was built about 1820 by George Taber. It still stands today and is heritage lists. It is in the grounds of the new Menangle Country Club on Menangle Road

Units based at Menangle Aerodrome
No. 1 Squadron RAAF
No. 15 Squadron RAAF
No. 23 Squadron RAAF
No. 83 Squadron RAAF
No. 164 Radar Station RAAF

After the abandonment of Menangle aerodrome, the site was a location for scenes for the film Smithy based on the historic flight of Charles Kingsford Smith.

Return to trotting
New South Wales Harness Racing Club acquired the site in 1952 and redeveloped the racecourse as a paceway, which officially opened on 26 September 1953.

The newly reconstructed paceway reopened in 2008 as Tabcorp Park, Menangle, and is the fastest and largest harness racing circuit in Australia at 1400 metres, and is now the major harness racing venue in New South Wales. In 2011, the track saw the first sub 1:50 mile ever run in Australasia, with Smoken Up running 1:48.5 in the Len Smith Mile.

Their main races are the Miracle Mile, the New South Wales Derby, the New South Wales Oaks, the Len Smith Mile and the qualifiers for the Miracle Mile, the Allied Express Sprint and the Canadian Club Sprint. It replaced Harold Park as Sydney's premier harness track in 2010. Fred Hastings is the NSW Harness lead race caller however Anthony Manton, Matt Jackson, Luke Marlow, Mitch Manners and Brandon Kreymborg have all called at this venue.

References

External links

 Official Site
Menangle Park History

Former Royal Australian Air Force bases
Military history of Sydney during World War II
Harness racing in Australia
Menangle Park, New South Wales